Pulavar Pulamaipithan (6 October 1935 – 8 September 2021) was an Indian scholar, poet and lyricist who got recognition through the song "Naan yaar nee yaar" which was featured in the Tamil film Kudiyirundha Koyil in 1968. He briefly served as the presidium chairman of AIADMK  from 2002 to 2003, when he resigned citing ill-health.

Biography 
Pulamaipithan was born in Irugur, Coimbatore, Tamil Nadu on 6 October 1935. At the early age Pulavar used to work in textile mill known as Combodia mills in Coimbatore and also studied his Tamil literature in Tava Tiru Shanthalinga Adigalar Perur Tamil Kaluri Coimbatore. He came to Chennai in 1964 with the ambition of writing songs for Tamil films. He worked as a Tamil teacher at Santhome high school before he started writing lyrics in Tamil films.

He served as Deputy Chairman of the Tamil Nadu Legislative Council, and was appointed "Arasavai Kavignar" (poet laureate) by the former Chief Minister of Tamil Nadu, M. G. Ramachandran.

Pulamaipithan died on 8 September 2021 at the age of 85.

Books 
Bookollamae Bali Pidamaai

Partial filmography 
He penned thousands of poems, some of which are:

 "Kudiyirundha Koyil"
 "Adimai Penn"
 "Kumari Kottam"
 "Nalla Neram"
 "Ninaithadhai Mudippavan"
 "Pallandu Vazhga"
 "Netru Indru Naalai (1974 film)"
 "Needhikku Thalaivanangu"
 "Madhuraiyai MeettaSundharapandiyan"
 "Sorgathin thirappu vizhaa"
 "Sivakamiyin Selvan"
 "Ulagam Sutrum Valiban"
 "Paruva Kaalam"
 "Rosapoo Ravikaikari"
 "Kanni Paruvathile"
 "Darling, Darling, Darling"
 "Idhu Namma Aalu"
 "Mundhanai Mudichu"
 "Kovil Pura"
 "Thanga Magan"
 "Panakkaran"
 "Kaakki Sattai"
 "Siva"
 "Eeramana Rojave"
 "Nayakan"
 "Unnal Mudiyum Thambi"
 "Azhagan"
 "Mounam Sammadham"
 "Kathal parisu"
 "Jayam"
 "Kasi"
 "Nandha"
 "Neengal Kettavai"
 "Nooravathu Naal"
 "Thevaikal"
 "Pavithra"
 "Naan Yen Piranthen"
 "Aaniver"
 "Kakki sattai"
 "Raja Kaiya Vacha"
 "Seetha"
 "Nilavu Suduvathillai"
 "Oorkavalan"
 "Neethiyim Marupakkam"
 "Enga Thambi"
 "Naan Sigappu Manithan"
 "Kuzhanthai Yesu"
 "Sirayil Pootha Chinna Malar"
 "Idhya Veenai"
 "Maragatha Veenai"
 "Deepam"
 "Panneer Nadhigal"
 "Kaathal Kiligal"
 "Thaalatu"
 "Kashmir Kathali"
 "Vaaliban"
 "Dharma Seelan"
 "Kanna Thorakkanum Saami"
 "Onna Irukka Kathukanum"
 "Ezhuthaatha Sattanggal"
 'Thudikkum Karangal"
 "Yeetti"
 "Rojavin Raja"
 "Muthalali Amma"
 "Manjal Nila"
 "Sonnathu Neethana"
 "Ilaiyavan"
 "Mella Pesungal"
 "Naan Puticha Maappillai"
 "Jeeva Nadi"
 "Sakkaalaththi"
 "Raja Rajathaan"
 "Seerivarum Kaalai"
 "Anbin Mugavari"
 "Kodai Mazhai"
 "Thirupura Sundari"
 "Vaazhkai"
 "Thandikapatta Nyayangal"
 "Ulley Veliye"
 "Kathirukka Neramillai"
 "Thodarum"
 "Thiruppumunai"
 "Jigu Jigu Rail"
 "Vietnam Colony"
 "Agni Paarvai"
 "Thedi Vantha Raasa"
 "Gowri"
 "Bandham"
 "Sattam Oru Vilayaattu"
 "Amutha Gaanam"
 "Vidinja Kalyanam"
 "Imsai Arasan 23rd Pulikecei"
 "Indiralohathil Na Azhagappan"
 "Tenaliraman"
 "Chithirayil Nilachoru"
 "Arima Nambi"
 "Theri (film)"
 "Raja Rishi"
 "Eli"

Awards 
 Tamil Nadu State film award for best lyrics in 1977–78 by the state government for the film Madhuraiyai Meetta Sundharapandiyan
 Tamil Nadu State film award for best lyrics in 1980–81 by the state government for the film Engamma Maharani.
 Tamil Nadu State film award for best lyrics in 1988 by the state government for multiple films.
 Tamil Nadu State film award for best lyrics in 1993 by the state government for the film Pathini Penn
 Periyar award in 2001 by Government of Tamil Nadu.

References

External links 
 
 

1935 births
2021 deaths
People from Coimbatore
Indian male poets
Indian lyricists
Tamil poets
Tamil writers
Tamil film poets
Tamil Nadu State Film Awards winners
20th-century Indian poets
Poets from Tamil Nadu
20th-century Indian male writers
Members of the Tamil Nadu Legislative Council